Auguri professore (Good Luck Professor) is a 1997 Italian comedy drama film directed by Riccardo Milani.

Plot 
The film is set in a school near Rome, and in a small mountain village of Abruzzo. The boys of the grammar school where teaches Professor Vincenzo Lipari, Italian teacher, are in serious crisis. The crisis, however, is not only that of a typical young adolescent: it is a real collective crisis that pushes young students to not studying, and caring of life, to believe in false ideals, and to get lost in the vortex of ignorance, that will not get them in any future. Vincenzo Lipari tries to help the guys, but also he is a frustrated like them, because they can not even organize a program of Italian lessons of the year. And so the man, trying to understand the new requirements youth, recalls his early school years: past, when teachers did not have to ask pupils to behave well in school, because it was all the opposite.

Cast 
Silvio Orlando as Professor Lipari
Claudia Pandolfi as Luisa
Duilio Del Prete as the headmaster 
Imma Piro as Professor Sollazzo

References

External links

1997 films
1997 comedy-drama films
Italian high school films
Italian comedy-drama films
Films directed by Riccardo Milani
Films about educators
1997 directorial debut films
1990s Italian-language films
1990s Italian films